Spigno Monferrato is a comune (municipality) in the Province of Alessandria in the Italian region of Piedmont, located about  southeast of Turin and about  southwest of Alessandria.

History

The land of Spigno was owned by the Count of Sales, an illegitimate brother of Victor Amadeus II of Savoy. It had previously been a fiefdom of the Holy Roman Empire. In 1730 he married morganatically to Anna Canalis di Cumiana, who was created the Marchioness of Spigno in her own right.

References

Cities and towns in Piedmont